Tatapudi (also spelled Taatapudi) is a small village located on the bay of the Godavari River. Tatapudi village is belonging to Ramachandara Puram Taluka in East Godavari district in Andhra Pradesh State of India.

References 

Villages in East Godavari district